"Love the One I'm With (A Lot of Love)" is a 1987 single by Melba Moore on the Capitol label. It peaked at No. 5 on the Billboard Hot Black Singles chart and features Kashif, released from her hit album, A Lot of Love.    Unlike the other singles from the album, it did not peak at number one.

Vinyl
12" version
 Love the One I'm With (A Lot of Love)
 Love the One I'm With Club Mix
 Love the One I'm With Club Edit

7" version
 Love the One I'm With (Melba & Kashif)
 Don't Go Away

References

External links
http://www.discogs.com/Melba-Moore-Love-The-One-Im-With-A-Lot-Of-Love/release/1813070

1987 singles
Melba Moore songs